Trofeo Melinda was a single-day road bicycle race held annually in Trentino-Alto Adige/Südtirol, Italy. After 2005, the race was organised as a 1.1 event on the UCI Europe Tour. It was created after the disappearance of Giro dell'Umbria, held between 1910 and 1991. In 2013 and 2014, the Trofeo Melinda was run as the Italian National Road Race Championships. After 2014, the race was merged with the nearby early-season stage-race Giro del Trentino.

Winners

*Held as Italian National Road Race Championship

References

External links
 

UCI Europe Tour races
Cycle races in Italy
Classic cycle races
Recurring sporting events established in 1992
1992 establishments in Italy
2014 disestablishments in Italy
Recurring sporting events disestablished in 2014
Defunct cycling races in Italy